Elissa Zanna Cameron is a New Zealand wildlife biologist whose research includes animal behaviour, ecology and conservation biology.

Academic career 

After graduating from Massey University with a PhD titled "Maternal investment in Kaimanawa horses" in 1999, Cameron moved to the University of Nevada, Reno from 2002 to 2006. She worked at the University of Pretoria from 2006 to 2010. She was promoted to full professor in November 2018 at the University of Canterbury.

Selected works

References

External links 

 
 
 

Living people
Year of birth missing (living people)
New Zealand women academics
Academic staff of the University of Pretoria
Academic staff of the University of Canterbury
Massey University alumni